"Aaron's Party (Come Get It)" is the first single from Aaron Carter's second studio album, Aaron's Party (Come Get It). It was his only pop hit in the United States, peaking at number 35 on the Billboard Hot 100. Outside the United States, it reached number 51 in the United Kingdom and number 71 in the Netherlands.

Music video
A music video was produced to promote the single, enacting the party scene of the song. The video shows Carter dancing in a house party with his friends while his parents are out on a date. Everything goes really well until Aaron's parents come home and find out that he threw a party while they were gone and they ground him as a result. The video was shot in Canada along with his other singles "Iko Iko", "I Want Candy", and "Bounce".

Track listings
US single
"Aaron's Party (Come Get It)" – 3:24
Snippets ("I Want Candy" and "Bounce") – 2:33
"Jump Jump" – 2:36
Aaron Talking – 0:51

UK single
"Aaron's Party (Come Get It)"
"Aaron's Party (Come Get It)" [Instrumental]
"(Have Some) Fun with the Funk"

Charts

Certifications

References

2000 singles
2000 songs
Aaron Carter songs
Jive Records singles
Songs about parties
Songs written by Brian Kierulf
Songs written by Josh Schwartz